The 2020 Missouri State Senate elections were held on November 3, 2020, to elect the seventeen Missouri State Senators to the Missouri State Senate. Half of the Senate's thirty-four seats are up for election every two years, with each Senator serving four-year terms. The last time that these seats were up for election was the 2016 Missouri State Senate election, and the next time that these seats will be up for election will be the 2024 Missouri State Senate election

Predictions

Results summary

Statewide

District
Results of the 2020 Missouri State Senate elections by district:

Close races
Districts where the margin of victory was under 10%:
District 15, 7.98%
District 17, 6.74%
District 19, 3.27%

District 1

Democratic Primary

Primary Results

Republican Primary

Primary Results

General Election

Results

District 3

Republican Primary

Primary Results

General Election

Results

District 5

Democratic Primary

Primary Results

Republican Primary

Primary Results

General Election

Results

District 7

Democratic Primary

Primary Results

Green Primary

Primary Results

General Election

Results

District 9

Democratic Primary

Primary Results

Republican Primary

Primary Results

General Election

Results

District 11

Democratic Primary

Primary Results

General Election

Results

District 13

Democratic Primary

Primary Results

Libertarian Primary

Primary Results

General Election

Results

District 15

Democratic Primary

Primary Results

Republican Primary

Primary Results

General Election

Results

District 17

Democratic Primary

Primary Results

Republican Primary

Primary Results

General Election

Results

District 19

Democratic Primary

Primary Results

Republican Primary

Primary Results

General Election

Results

District 21

Republican Primary

Primary Results

Libertarian Primary

Primary Results

General Election

Results

District 23

Democratic Primary

Primary Results

Republican Primary

Primary Results

General Election

Results

District 25

Republican Primary

Primary Results

General Election

Results

District 27

Democratic Primary

Primary Results

Republican Primary

Primary Results

General Election

Results

District 29

Republican Primary

Primary Results

General Election

Results

District 31

Democratic Primary

Primary Results

Republican Primary

Primary Results

General Election

Results

District 33

Democratic Primary

Primary Results

Republican Primary

Primary Results

General Election

Results

References 

Senate
2020
Missouri Senate